Antinephele camerounensis is a moth of the family Sphingidae. It was described by Benjamin Preston Clark in 1937 and is found from Gabon to the Central African Republic, Uganda and Kenya.

References

Antinephele
Moths described in 1937
Moths of Africa